Louis Antoine Sophie de Vignerot du Plessis, 4th Duke of Richelieu (4 February 1736 – 1791), was a French nobleman and general. He was known by the courtesy title of Duke of Fronsac before 1788. He also held the titles of Prince de Mortagne, Marquis du Pont-Courlay, Comte de Cosnac, Baron de Barbezieux, Baron de Coze and Baron de Saugeon.

Life and career
He was the son of Louis François Armand de Vignerot du Plessis (1696–1788), 3rd Duke of Richelieu, Marshal of France and an expert courtier, and of Marie Élisabeth Sophie de Lorraine (daughter of Anne Marie Joseph de Lorraine. Madame de Pompadour wished Antoine to marry her daughter, but his father avoided that demand by pretending that Antoine's mother was a Princess of Lorraine (much superior to the house of Richelieu) and that he would thus need the permission of the head of that house (Emperor Francis I) for the marriage. Madame de Pompadour did not press her claims any further.

A first cousin was Marie Charlotte, Princess of Beauvau, wife of Charles Juste de Beauvau and daughter of the Duke of Bouillon.

He succeeded his father as a premier gentilhomme de la chambre to King Louis XVI, and later became a maréchal de camp and lieutenant général (1780).

Marriage and issue
His first marriage, on 25 February 1764, was to Adélaïde de Hautefort. They had one child, Armand Emmanuel (1766–1822). 

His second marriage, on 20 April 1776, was to Marie-Antoinette de Galliffet. They had two children :
 Armande Marie (born 1777), who became Marquise de Montcalm-Gozon
 Armande Simplicie Gabrielle (born 1778), who became Marquise de Jumilhac

Ancestry

Bibliography
 Evelyne Lever, Madame de Pompadour, collection tempus, Perrin, Paris, 2000 

1736 births
1791 deaths
French generals
Louis
18th-century peers of France